A by-election was held in the state electoral district of North Shore on 5 February 1994. The by-election was triggered by the resignation of Liberal Party member Phillip Smiles.

Dates

Results

Phillip Smiles resigned.
The Labor Party did not nominate a candidate.

See also
Electoral results for the district of North Shore
List of New South Wales state by-elections

References

1994 elections in Australia
New South Wales state by-elections
1990s in New South Wales